Most Ven. Ambagahawatte Indrasabhawara Gnanasami Maha Thera (legal name: Cornelis Madanayake) was the founder of Sri Lanka Ramanna Nikaya and Sri Dharmagupta Pirivena of Mūla Maha Viharaya, Payagala, Kalutara. He was the first Maha Nayaka Thera of Sri Lanka Ramanna Nikaya.

See also
 Sri Lankan Buddhism
 Siam Nikaya
 Amarapura Nikaya
 Ramanna Nikaya
 Weweldeniye Medhalankara Thero
 Nauyane Ariyadhamma Mahathera

References

External links
 Official website of the Sri Lanka Ramanna Nikaya
 

Theravada Buddhist monks
Buddhism in Sri Lanka
1832 births
1886 deaths
Sri Lankan Buddhist monks